WCGL (1360 kHz) is a commercial AM radio station broadcasting an urban gospel radio format. Licensed to Jacksonville, Florida, United States, the station is currently owned by JBD Communications, Inc.  The station airs contemporary gospel music and some preaching programs, aimed at the African-American community.  It uses the moniker "The Victory Station."

WCGL transmits with 5,000 watts by day, but to avoid interfering with other radio stations on AM 1360, WCGL reduces power at night to only 89 watts.  Listeners in Jacksonville and adjacent communities can hear WCGL programming on an FM translator station, 94.7 W234CW.

History
The station first signed on the air in 1948 as WOBS.  It was owned by the Southern Radio & Equipment Company and was a daytimer.  It originally broadcast at 1,000 watts by day and had to go off the air at sunset.

References

External links

CGL
Gospel radio stations in the United States
CGL